NASA DART may refer to:
 NASA's Demonstration for Autonomous Rendezvous Technology, a NASA mission intended to demonstrate an automated navigation and rendezvous capability, launched in April 2005.
 NASA's Double Asteroid Redirection Test, a NASA mission aimed at testing a method of planetary defense against near-Earth objects (NEO), launched in November 2021.